In the 1922/1923 Danish National Football Tournament, Boldklubben Frem won the championship.

Province tournament

First round
IK Viking Rønne 0-1 Frederiksborg IF

Second round
Frederiksborg IF 3-1 Boldklubben 1901
Boldklubben 1913 3-3 Aarhus Gymnastikforening (AGF won after drawing lots)

Third round
Aarhus Gymnastikforening 3-0 Frederiksborg IF

Copenhagen Championship

Final
Boldklubben Frem 2-1 Aarhus Gymnastikforening

References
Denmark - List of final tables (RSSSF)

Top level Danish football league seasons
1922–23 in Danish football
Denmark